The 2015–16 season is Brighton & Hove Albion 114th year in existence and fifth consecutive season in the Championship. Along with competing in the Championship, the club will also participate in the FA Cup and League Cup. The season covers the period from 1 July 2015 to 30 June 2016.

Brighton enjoyed a much improved season after narrowly avoiding relegation the season prior, finishing an impressive 3rd place in the Championship table below Middlesbrough only on an inferior goal difference of two goals. Brighton only lost five games throughout the entire season, a feat matched by champions Burnley who only finished with four more points than Brighton.

The season began in spectacular fashion for Brighton, where they embarked on a 21 game unbeaten run that saw them occupy an automatic promotion place for much of the first half of the season. However, they would then lose four out of their five following games, dropping out of the top two and only sporadically occupying second place throughout the season, fighting a fierce contest with promotion rivals Hull City, Derby County, Middlesbrough and Burnley. After this mid-season dip in form, Brighton would only lose one more game throughout the rest of the season, and went into the final game of the Championship season away at second-placed Middlesbrough level on points with them but behind them on goal difference, knowing only a win would secure automatic promotion. The two teams drew 1–1, and Brighton finished the season in a play-off position instead.

A third play-off campaign for the Seagulls in four seasons ensued, however it would again end in defeat at the semi-final stage for a third time, as Brighton lost 3–1 on aggregate over two legs against Sheffield Wednesday.

Squad

Development squad and youth team

Out on loan

Transfers

Transfers in

Total outgoing:  £5,750,000

Transfers out

Loans in

Loans out

Pre-season

Friendlies
On 5 May 2015, Brighton & Hove Albion announced four pre-season friendlies, Away to Lewes on 18 July 2015, Away to Crawley Town on 22 July 2015, Away to Aberdeen on 26 July 2015 and Away to Gillingham on 29 July 2015. On 25 May 2015, Brighton & Hove Albion announced they will face 2015 Europa League finalists Sevilla at home on 2 August 2015. On 23 June 2015, Brighton & Hove albion announced Swiss opposition for 11 July 2015.

Competitions

Championship

League table

Results summary

Results round by round

Matches
On 17 June 2015, the fixtures for the forthcoming season were announced.

Play-Offs

FA Cup
Brighton & Hove Albion entered the FA Cup in the third round, which was drawn on 7 December 2015. Brighton were drawn away against Hull City.

League Cup
On 16 June 2015, the first round draw was made, Brighton & Hove Albion were drawn away against Southend United. In the second round, Brighton were drawn away to Walsall.

Statistics

Goalscorers

Disciplinary Record

References

Brighton and Hove Albion
Brighton & Hove Albion F.C. seasons